This page provides the summaries of the CONCACAF Second Round matches for 2014 FIFA World Cup qualification.

Format
The second round saw the teams ranked 7–25 joined by the 5 winners from the first round. These teams were drawn into six groups of four teams, at the World Cup Preliminary Draw at the Marina da Glória in Rio de Janeiro, Brazil on 30 July 2011.

The matches were played between 2 September to 15 November 2011. The top team from each group advanced to the third round.

Seeding
Teams were seeded into four pots – designated Pots 4 to 7 in the draw. Pot 4 included teams ranked 7–12, Pot 5 teams ranked 13–18, Pot 6 teams ranked 19–24, and Pot 7 the team ranked 25 along with the 5 first round winners.

† First round winners

Groups
Note: Scores marked by * are results awarded by FIFA.

Group A

Group B

Group C

Bahamas withdrew from the tournament on 19 August 2011 and were not replaced.

Group D

Group E

Group F

Goalscorers
There were 228 goals scored over 66 games, for an average of 3.45 goals per game.

8 goals
 Peter Byers

7 goals
 Deon McCaulay

6 goals

 Tamarley Thomas
 Rocky Siberie
 Blas Pérez

5 goals

 Erick Ozuna
 Jean-Eudes Maurice

4 goals

 Randolph Burton
 Simeon Jackson
 Kervens Belfort
 Luis Tejada
 Héctor Ramos
 Lester Peltier

3 goals

 Khano Smith
 Iain Hume
 Olivier Occean
 Josh Simpson
 Léster Blanco
 Osael Romero
 Freddy García
 Mario Rodríguez
 Ian Lake
 Kenwyne Jones

2 goals

 Nahki Wells
 Dwayne De Rosario
 Tosaint Ricketts
 Mark Ebanks
 Sendley Bito
 Shanon Carmelia
 Luis Anaya
 Christian Bautista
 Rafael Burgos
 Rodolfo Zelaya
 Clive Murray
 Shane Rennie
 Minor López
 Vurlon Mills
 Ricky Shakes
 Jean Alexandre
 James Marcelin
 Raúl Leguías
 Ricardo Buitrago
 Amir Waithe
 Andrés Cabrero
 Cliff Valcin
 Myron Samuel
 Cornelius Stewart
 Friso Mando

1 goal

 Ranjae Christian
 Justin Cochrane
 George Dublin
 Quinton Griffith
 Marc Joseph
 Keiran Murtagh
 Kerry Skepple
 Jamie Thomas
 Diquan Adamson
 Sheridan Grosvenor
 Harrison Róches
 Ryan Simpson
 John Nusum
 Antwan Russell
 Kwame Steede
 Will Johnson
 Angelo Cijntje
 Orin de Waard
 Everon Espacia
 Rihairo Meulens
 Angelo Zimmerman
 Johan Cruz
 César García
 Jonathan Faña
 Jack Michael Morillo
 Inoel Navarro
 Domingo Peralta
 Kerbi Rodríguez
 Jaime Alas
 Xavier García
 Steve Purdy
 Edwin Sánchez
 Herbert Sosa
 Victor Turcios
 Lancaster Joseph
 Marcus Julien
 Cassim Langaigne
 Gustavo Cabrera
 Yony Flores
 Carlos Gallardo
 Angelo Padilla
 Marco Pappa
 Dwight Pezzarossi
 Guillermo Ramírez
 Carlos Ruiz
 Fredy Thompson
 Anthony Abrams
 Shawn Beveney
 Leon Cort
 Chris Nurse
 Charles Pollard
 Judelin Aveska
 Réginal Goreux
 Wilde Donald Guerrier
 Kim Jaggy
 Kevin Lafrance
 Jean Monuma
 Listner Pierre-Louis
 Daniel Reyes
 Félix Rodríguez
 Rolando Blackburn
 Cristian Arrieta
 Joseph Marrero
 Devaughn Elliott
 Jevon Francis
 Orlando Mitchum
 Tremain Paul
 Zaine Pierre
 Giovanni Drenthe
 Evani Esperance
 Naldo Kwasie
 Keon Daniel
 Hughton Hector
 Kevin Molino
 Darryl Roberts
 Jamie Browne
 Keithroy Cornelius

1 own goal
 Angelo Zimmerman (against Haiti)
 Lyndon Joseph (against Guatemala)
 Nicko Williams (against Guatemala)
 Román Torres (against Nicaragua)

Notes

References

External links
Results and schedule (FIFA.com version)
Results and schedule (CONCACAF.com version)

2014 FIFA World Cup qualification (CONCACAF)
Qual2